USC&GS Dailhache was a United States Coast and Geodetic Survey ship in service from 1919 to 1934.

Dailhache was built as the civilian yacht Olympic in 1913 by E. W. Heath at Seattle, Washington. She served in the United States Navy from 1917 to 1919, operating as the patrol vessel USS Olympic (SP-260) during World War I.

Olympic was transferred to the Coast and Geodetic Survey on 13 September 1919 and renamed Dailhache on 12 November 1919. She served at Seattle with the Survey until sold to H. W. McCurdy on 10 February 1934.

References

NavSource Online: Section Patrol Craft Photo Archive: USC&GS Dailhache ex-USS Olympic (SP 260)

Ships of the United States Coast and Geodetic Survey
Ships transferred from the United States Navy to the United States Coast and Geodetic Survey
Survey ships of the United States
Ships built in Seattle
1913 ships